Ōkubo Tadayoshi may refer to:

Odawara Domain:
 Ōkubo Tadayoshi (I) (1736–1769), the fifth daimyō of the Odawara Domain
 Ōkubo Tadayoshi (II) (1857–1877), the 10th daimyō of the Odawara Domain

Karasuyama Domain:

Ōkubo Tadayoshi (1769–1812), the fourth daimyō of the Ōkubo Karasuyama Domain
Ōkubo Tadayoshi (1848–1864), the seventh daimyō of the Ōkubo Karasuyama Domain